Atibie is a small town in the Kwahu South District in the  Eastern Region of Ghana. The Odweanoma Mountain is located along the Atibie road.

Institutions 

 Atibie Nursing and Midwifery Training College
 Atibie Hospital

References

Populated places in the Eastern Region (Ghana)